Bomer is a surname. Notable people with the surname include:

 Elton Bomer (born 1935), American insurance executive and politician
 Matt Bomer (born 1977), American actor
 Sally Bomer, American dancer and choreographer

See also
 Bozer

English-language surnames